The 1996 Amsterdam Admirals season was the second season for the franchise in the World League of American Football (WLAF). The team was led by head coach Al Luginbill in his second year, and played its home games at Olympisch Stadion in Amsterdam, Netherlands. They finished the regular season in third place with a record of five wins and five losses.

Offseason

World League draft

Personnel

Staff

Roster

Schedule

Standings

Game summaries

Week 1: at Barcelona Dragons

Week 2: vs Rhein Fire

Week 3: at Scottish Claymores

Week 4: at Frankfurt Galaxy

Week 5: vs London Monarchs

Week 6: vs Barcelona Dragons

Week 7: at London Monarchs

Week 8: vs Scottish Claymores

Week 9: at Rhein Fire

Week 10: vs Frankfurt Galaxy

Notes

References

Amsterdam Admirals seasons